The 192 members of the Universal Postal Union are listed below in alphabetical order, with the date of membership. Members are the Vatican City and the 193 UN members except Andorra, Marshall Islands, the Federated States of Micronesia, and Palau. The newest member is South Sudan, which joined on 4 October 2011.

Before 10 July 1964, states became members of the UPU by ratifying the latest version of the Treaty of Bern. After this date, states become members by ratifying the Constitution of the Universal Postal Union, which incorporated the Treaty of Bern and added provisions to it. Three states which were party to the Treaty of Bern in 1964, and hence members of the UPU, and which have signed but never ratified the Constitution are the Dominican Republic, Honduras, and Sudan.  These states are deemed to have "tacitly ratified" the agreement due to their continued participation in the UPU.  Also included as members are two "joint memberships" for dependent territories (one for the British overseas territories and one for the Caribbean constituent countries of the Kingdom of the Netherlands (Aruba, Curaçao and Sint Maarten), originally as Netherlands Antilles). Dependent territories are not permitted to ratify the UPU Constitution, but because the Treaty of Bern allowed for dependencies to join the UPU, listing these members separately as "Colonies, Protectorates, etc.", the Constitution of the Universal Postal Union grandfathered them when membership was restricted to sovereign states.  However, neither the British nor the Dutch entities ratified the Treaty of Bern separate from the ratifications of the United Kingdom and the Kingdom of the Netherlands, respectively.

By virtue of article 23 of the UPU Constitution, other dependencies of UPU member states are covered by its membership. Territories covered by a sovereign member state are listed under that country.

A

  – 1 April 1928
  – 1 March 1922
  – 1 October 1907
  – 1 March 1977
  – 20 January 1994
  – 1 April 1878
  – 14 October 1992
  – 1 October 1907
 
  – 1 July 1875
  – 1 April 1993

B

  – 24 April 1974
  – 21 December 1973
  – 7 February 1973
  – 11 November 1967
  – 13 May 1947
  – 1 July 1875
  – 1 October 1982
  – 27 April 1961
  – 7 March 1969
  – 1 April 1886
  – 26 January 1993
  – 12 January 1968
  – 1 July 1877
  – 15 January 1985
British overseas territories – 1 April 1877
 
 
 
 
 
 
 
 
 
 
 
Dependencies of St Helena
 
 
 
  – 1 July 1879
  – 29 March 1963
  – 6 April 1963

C

  – 21 December 1951
  – 26 July 1960
  – 1 July 1878
  – 30 September 1976
  – 28 June 1961
  – 23 June 1961
  – 1 April 1881
  – 1 March 1914
   – 1 April 1877
 
  – 1 July 1881
  – 29 July 1976
  – 1 January 1886
  – 5 July 1961
  – 1 January 1883
  – 23 May 1961
  – 20 July 1992
  – 4 October 1902
  – 23 November 1961
  – 18 March 1993

D

  – 1 July 1875
 
 
  – 6 June 1978
  – 31 January 1980
  – 1 October 1880

E

  – 1 July 1880
  – 1 July 1875
  – 1 April 1879
  – 24 July 1970
  – 19 August 1993
  – 30 April 1992
  - 7 November 1969
  – 1 November 1908

F

  – 18 June 1971
  – 12 February 1918
 
  – 1 January 1876
French Overseas Departments
 
  (including Saint Barthélemy and Saint Martin)
 
 
 
 
Territories coming within the UPU's jurisdiction by virtue of article 23 of the UPU Constitution
  (including Clipperton Island)

G

  – 17 July 1961
  – 9 October 1974
  – 1 April 1993
  – 1 July 1875
  – 10 October 1957
  – 1 July 1875
  – 30 January 1978
  – 1 August 1881
  – 6 May 1959
  – 30 May 1974
  – 22 March 1967

H

  – 1 July 1881
  – 1 April 1879
  – 1 July 1875

I

  – 15 November 1919
  – 1 July 1876
  – 1 May 1877
  – 1 September 1877
  – 22 April 1929
  – 6 September 1923
  – 24 December 1949
  – 1 July 1875

J

  – 29 August 1963
  – 1 June 1877
  – 16 May 1947

K

  – 27 August 1992
  – 27 October 1964
  – 14 August 1984
  – 6 June 1974
  – 1 January 1900
  – 16 February 1960
  – 26 January 1993

L

  – 20 May 1952
  – 17 June 1992
  – 15 May 1946
  – 6 September 1967
  – 1 April 1879
  – 4 June 1952
  – 13 April 1962
  – 10 January 1992
  – 1 July 1875

M
  – 2 November 1961
  – 25 October 1966
  – 17 January 1958
  – 15 August 1967
  – 21 April 1961
  – 21 May 1965
  – 22 March 1967
  – 29 August 1969
  – 1 April 1879
  – 16 November 1992
  – 12 October 1955
  – 24 August 1963
  – 26 July 2006
  – 1 October 1920
  – 11 October 1978
  – 4 October 1949

N

  – 30 April 1992
  – 17 April 1969
  – 11 October 1956
  – 1 July 1875
Aruba, Curaçao and Sint Maarten – 1 July 1875
 
 
 
  (including the Ross Dependency) – 1 October 1907
  (Free Association with New Zealand)
  (Free Association with New Zealand)
 
  – 1 May 1882
  – 12 June 1961
  – 10 July 1961
  – 12 July 1993
  – 1 July 1875

O

  – 17 August 1971

P

  – 10 November 1947
  – 11 June 1904
  – 4 June 1976
  – 1 July 1881
  – 1 April 1879
  – 1 January 1922
  – 1 May 1919
  – 1 July 1875

Q

  – 31 January 1969

R

  – 1 July 1875
  – 1 July 1875
  – 6 April 1963

S

  – 11 January 1988
  – 10 July 1980
  – 3 February 1981
  – 9 August 1989
  – 1 July 1915
  – 22 August 1977
  – 1 January 1927
  – 14 June 1961
  – 18 June 2001
  – 7 October 1977
  – 29 January 1962
  – 8 January 1966
  – 18 March 1993
  – 27 August 1992
  – 4 May 1984
  – 1 April 1959
  – 22 August 1994
  – 4 October 2011
  – 1 July 1875
  – 13 July 1949
  – 28 July 1956
  – 20 April 1976
  – 1 July 1875
  – 1 July 1875
  – 15 May 1946

T

  – 9 June 1994
  – 29 March 1963
  – 1 July 1885
  – 28 November 2003
  – 21 March 1962
  (including Niuafo'ou) – 26 January 1972
  – 15 June 1963
  – 1 July 1888
  – 1 July 1875
  – 26 January 1993
  – 3 February 1981

U

  – 13 February 1964
  – 13 May 1947
  – 30 March 1973
  – 1 July 1875
 The Crown dependencies of the United Kingdom are not members of the UPU, and are represented by the United Kingdom
 
 
 
  – 1 July 1875
Territories coming within the UPU's jurisdiction by virtue of article 23 of the UPU Constitution
 
 
 
 
 
  – 1 July 1880
  – 24 February 1994

V

  – 16 July 1982
  – 1 June 1929
  – 1 January 1880
  – 20 October 1951

Y

  – 1 January 1930

Z

  – 22 March 1967
  – 31 July 1981

Observer states
  – Has special observer status to the UPU since 1999, West Bank mail delivered through Jordan since 2008. From  up to 2010 Gaza strip mail was delivered through Israel.  On 15 November 2018, the president of the State of Palestine signed documents to accede to the UPU as a full member.

States not participating in UPU activities
In general areas governed by organizations that are not members of the UPU, must have their international mail handled by a member state.
  – mail routed through France or Spain.
  (mail transportation handled by the United States Postal Service)
  (mail transportation handled by the United States Postal Service)
  (mail transportation handled by the United States Postal Service)

Entities not participating in UPU activities
  Order of Malta mail routed through Italy. Additionally, its stamps are accepted by 57 UPU members.

States with limited recognition

These states need to have their mail routed through third countries as the UPU will not allow direct international deliveries
  mail routed through Ethiopia
  mail routed through Turkey
  mail routed through Serbia
  mail routed through Russia
  mail routed through Russia
  mail routed through Armenia
  mail routed through Moldova
  mail routed through Algeria
  (Republic of China) mail routed through Japan and the United States

Former member countries of the UPU
In the course of history a number of member countries of the UPU saw their membership lapse, due to political changes. Where there was an immediate successor state, membership would normally devolve on that state. In other cases membership lapsed.

  Kingdom of Hawaii – 1 January 1882 – 14 June 1900 (organized as the Territory of Hawaii, an organized incorporated territory of the United States)
  – 1 January 1898 – 31 May 1902
  – 1 January 1895 – 31 May 1902
  – January 1879 – 1957 (became Ghana)
  From 18 May 1920 –  and the  ratified the treaty after Czechoslovakia dissolved in 1992. Wartime Slovakia (1939–1945) ratified the Universal Postal Treaty and all its protocols on 5/8/1941.
  (country ceased to exist in 1992)
  1941–1945 (country ceased to exist)
  – 1 March 1914 – 1 October 1949 (politically ceased to exist; confined to Taiwan from 7 December 1949)
  – 1 January 1900 – 29 August 1910 (annexed by Japan)
  (country ceased to exist in 1975)
  From 1 July 1875 (country ceased to exist in 1990)
  (country ceased to exist in 1990)

See also
List of postal entities, a list of the postal authorities and operators of UPU members.

Notes

References

Further reading
 List of member countries of the Universal Postal Union: showing their contribution class, geographical group and legal situation with regard to the Acts of the Union. Bern: International Bureau of the Universal Postal Union, 2005 13p.

Members
+Aa
Postal systems
Countries by international organization
Lists of parties to treaties
United Nations-related lists